Kuldip Singh Dhingra is an Indian entrepreneur, promoter and chairman of Berger Paints. Kuldip is among the 100 Richest Indian and Forbes global billionaires. He currently has a net worth of US$ 9.4 Billion according to Forbes. (As of 20 June 2021)

Early life
Kuldip born (1947) was born into a Sikh Punjabi Arora business family in Amritsar, Punjab, India. His grandfather has started the paint business in 1898 in Amritsar. Kuldip holds a bachelor's degree from Delhi University.

Berger Paints
In 1991 Kuldip along with his brother Gurbachan Singh Dhingra purchased Berger paints from UB group of Vijay Mallya.

The book Unstoppable: Kuldip Singh Dhingra and the Rise of Berger Paints is the biography of Kuldip Singh Dhingra written by the author Sonu Bhasin.

Association
Kuldip serves as director of Ashi Farms, Anshana properties, Arambol properties, Citland commercial credits, KSD buildwell, KSD probuilt, Lobelia buildwell, Scorpio research and consultants, Vinu farms, Vignette investments, United stock exchange, Wazir estate, Wazir properties, UKPI plantations, UK Paints, Sunaina evergreen, Surjit Plantations, Berger becker coatings, Berger paints, Jolly properties, Kanwar green lands, Rishkul properties, Amrit Plantations, Meeta plantations, Malibu estates, RPL forests, bigg investments and finance, Flex properties, Burgeon properties, Britona properties, Harman greenfields, Pagoda buildcon, Rishma meadows, Fable propbuild, Flume propbuild.

Family
Kuldip is married to Meeta Dhingra and has three children. Kuldip's daughter, Rishma Kaur, is part the business and is married to Raninder Singh (m.1995), scion of the Royal family of Patiala. They together have three children namely: Seherinder Kaur (b.1996), Inayatinder Kaur (b.1999) and a son, Yadauinder Singh (b.2003). The entire family lives in New Delhi.

References

Living people
People from New Delhi
Indian industrialists
Indian billionaires
Businesspeople from Delhi
1947 births
People from Amritsar
Indian Sikhs